Zandvoorde may refer to:
 Zandvoorde, Ostend, a Belgian village, part of the city of Ostend
 Zandvoorde, Zonnebeke, a Belgian village, part of the municipality of Zonnebeke

See also
 Zandvoort, North Holland, Netherlands
 Sandford (disambiguation)